Gliomastix is a genus of fungi belonging to the family Bionectriaceae.

The genus was first described by Fernand Pierre Joseph Guéguen in 1905.

The genus has cosmopolitan distribution.

Species:
 Gliomastix luzulae
 Gliomastix murorum
 Gliomastix roseogrisea

References

Hypocreales genera
Bionectriaceae